Boone County is located in the U.S. state of Missouri. Centrally located in Mid-Missouri, its county seat is Columbia, Missouri's fourth-largest city and location of the University of Missouri. As of the 2020 census, the population was 183,610, making it the state's eighth-most populous county. The county was organized November 16, 1820 and named for the then recently deceased Daniel Boone, whose kin largely populated the Boonslick area, having arrived in the 1810s on the Boone's Lick Road.
Boone County comprises the Columbia Metropolitan Area. The towns of Ashland and Centralia are the second and third most populous towns in the county.

History
Boone County was organized November 16, 1820, from a portion of the territorial Howard County. The area was then known as Boone's Lick Country, because of a salt lick which Daniel Boone's sons used for their stock.

Boone County was settled primarily from the Upper South states of Kentucky, Tennessee and Virginia. The settlers brought slaves and slave-holding with them, and quickly started cultivating crops similar to those in Middle Tennessee and Kentucky: hemp and tobacco. Boone was one of several counties to the north and south of the Missouri River that was settled by southerners. Because of its culture and traditions, the area became known as Little Dixie, and Boone County was at its heart. In 1860 slaves made up 25 percent or more of the county's population, Boone County was strongly pro-Confederate during the American Civil War.

Shortly after the murder of President Lincoln, the leading citizens of the county denounced the killing. They also directed that all public buildings including the courthouse and the university be draped in mourning for thirty days.

Geography
The Missouri River makes up the southern border of the county.

National protected area
Big Muddy National Fish and Wildlife Refuge
Mark Twain National Forest (part)

Adjacent counties
Audrain County (northeast)
Callaway County (east)
Cole County (south)
Cooper County (west)
Howard County (northwest)
Moniteau County (southwest)
Randolph County (north)

Major highways
 Interstate 70
 Interstate 70 Business Loop
 U.S. Route 40 
 U.S. Route 63

 Route 22
 Route 124
 Route 163
 Route 740
 Route 763

Demographics

As of the census of 2000, there were 135,454 people, 53,094 households, and 31,378 families residing in the county. The population density was 198 people per square mile (76/km2). There were 56,678 housing units at an average density of 83 per square mile (32/km2). The racial makeup of the county was 85.43% White, 8.54% Black or African American, 0.42% Native American, 2.96% Asian, 0.03% Pacific Islander, 0.69% from other races, and 1.93% from two or more races. Approximately 1.78% of the population were Hispanic or Latino of any race. 24.6% claimed German, 12.3% American, 11.2% English and 9.8% Irish ancestry.

There were 53,094 households, out of which 30.30% had children under the age of 18 living with them, 45.50% were married couples living together, 10.40% had a female householder with no husband present, and 40.90% were non-families. 28.70% of all households were made up of individuals, and 6.20% had someone living alone who was 65 years of age or older. The average household size was 2.38 and the average family size was 2.97.

In the county, the population was spread out, with 22.80% under the age of 18, 19.90% from 18 to 24, 29.90% from 25 to 44, 18.80% from 45 to 64, and 8.60% who were 65 years of age or older. The median age was 30 years. For every 100 females, there were 93.50 males. For every 100 females age 18 and over, there were 90.90 males.

The median income for a household in the county was $37,485, and the median income for a family was $51,210. Males had a median income of $33,304 versus $25,990 for females. The per capita income for the county was $19,844. About 7.60% of families and 14.50% of the population were below the poverty line, including 12.10% of those under age 18 and 5.90% of those age 65 or over.

There are 121,319 registered voters.

Religion

According to the Association of Religion Data Archives County Membership Report (2010), Boone County is sometimes regarded as being on the northern edge of the Bible Belt, with evangelical Protestantism being the most predominant religion. The most predominant denominations among residents in Boone County who adhere to a religion are Southern Baptists (20.81%), Roman Catholics (16.71%), and nondenominational evangelical groups (13.23%).

2020 Census

Education

Public schools
Ashland R-I School District* 
Southern Boone Elementary
Southern Boone Middle School
Southern Boone High School
Centralia R-VI School District – Centralia
Chance Elementary School (PK-02) 
Centralia Intermediate School (03-05) 
Chester Boren Middle School (06-08) 
Centralia High School (09-12) 
Columbia School District No. 93 – Columbia
Center for Gifted Education (01-05)
Cedar Ridge Elementary School (PK-05) 
Thomas Benton Elementary School (PK-05) 
John Ridgeway Elementary School (K-05) 
Eugene Field/ Alpha Hart Lewis Elementary School (PK-05) 
Midway Heights Elementary School (PK-05) 
Ulysses S. Grant Elementary School (PK-05) 
Two Mile Prairie Elementary School (PK-05) 
New Haven Elementary School (PK-05) 
West Boulevard Elementary School (PK-05) 
Locust Street Expressive Arts Elementary School
Parkade Elementary School (PK-05) 
Blue Ridge Elementary School (PK-05) 
Fairview Elementary School (PK-05) 
Russell Boulevard Elementary School (PK-05) 
Shepard Boulevard Elementary School (PK-05) 
Mary Paxton Keeley Elementary School (PK-05) 
Beulah Ralph Elementary School (PK-05)
Eliot Battle Elementary School (PK-05)
Derby Ridge Elementary School (PK-05) 
Mill Creek Elementary School (PK-05) 
John B. Lange Middle School (06-08) 
Ann Hawkins Gentry Middle School (06-08) 
Smithton Middle School (06-08) 
Oakland Middle School (06-08) 
Jefferson Middle School (06-08) 
West Middle School (06-08)
Warner Middle School (06-08)
David H. Hickman High School (09-12)
Muriel Battle High School (09-12) 
Frederick Douglass High School (09-12) – Alternative School 
Rock Bridge High School (09-12)
Hallsville R-IV School District – Hallsville
Hallsville Primary School (PK-01) 
Hallsville Intermediate School (02-05) 
Hallsville Middle School (06-08) 
Hallsville High School (09-12)
Harrisburg R-VIII School District – Harrisburg
Harrisburg Elementary School (PK-06) 
Harrisburg Middle School (07-08) 
Harrisburg High School (09-12)
Sturgeon R-V School District – Sturgeon 
Sturgeon Elementary School (K-04) 
Sturgeon Middle School (05-08) 
Sturgeon High School (09-12)

Private schools
Apple School – Columbia (PK-K) – Nonsectarian
Children's House And Windsor Street Montessori – Columbia (PK-06) – Nonsectarian – Coed
Christian Chapel Academy – Columbia (K-08) – Pentecostal
Christian Fellowship School – Columbia (PK-12) – Nondenominational Christian
College Park Christian Academy – Columbia (K-09) – Seventh-day Adventist
Our Lady of Lourdes Interparish School– Columbia (K-08) – Roman Catholic
Columbia Independent School – Columbia (PK-12) – Nonsectarian
Columbia KinderCare – Columbia (NS-PK) – Nonsectarian
Columbia Montessori School – Columbia (PK-K) – Nonsectarian
Father Tolton Regional High School- Columbia (09-12) – Roman Catholic
Good Shepherd Lutheran School – Columbia (K-08) – Lutheran
Heritage Academy – Columbia (03-12) – Nondenominational Christian – Alternative School
Islamic School of Columbia, Missouri – Columbia (K-05) – Muslim 
Morningside Community School – Columbia (05-07) – Nonsectarian
Shalom Christian Academy – Columbia (PK-12) – Nonsectarian
Harrisburg Early Learning Center – Harrisburg (NS/PK-06)
Sunnydale Adventist Academy – Centralia (09-12) – Seventh-day Adventist

Post secondary
University of Missouri – Columbia A public, four-year flagship university.
Columbia College – Columbia A private, four-year university.
Stephens College – Columbia A private, four-year women's university.
Moberly Area Community College (MACC), a two-year public college, operates a Columbia satellite campus.

Public libraries
 Centralia Public Library  
 Daniel Boone Regional Library
 Southern Boone County Public Library 
 Holts Summit Public Library 
 Columbia Public Library

Politics

Local
Like nearly all counties nationwide with a major university, the Democratic Party predominantly controls politics at the local level in Boone County. Democrats currently hold all of the elected county-wide positions.

State

Boone County is split between five legislative districts in the Missouri House of Representatives. Three are held by Republicans, with two held by Democrats.

District 44 — Cheri Toalson Reisch (R-Hallsville). Consists of the communities of Centralia, Hallsville, Sturgeon, and northeastern Columbia.

District 45 — David Smith (D-Columbia). Consists of the north-central part of the city of Columbia.

District 46 – Martha Stevens (D-Columbia). Consists of the southern part of the city of Columbia.

District 47 — Charles Basye (R-Rocheport). Consists of the western part of the city of Columbia and the communities of Harrisburg and Rocheport.

District 50 – Sara Walsh Consists of  parts of the city of Columbia and the communities of Ashland, Hartsburg, and McBaine.

All of Boone County is a part of Missouri's 19th District in the Missouri Senate and is currently represented by Caleb Rowden (R-Columbia), who is the Majority Floor Leader. However, Democrats have carried Boone County in recent elections.

Federal
All of Boone County is included in Missouri's 4th Congressional District and is currently represented by Vicky Hartzler (R-Harrisonville) in the U.S. House of Representatives. Hartzler was elected to a sixth term in 2020 over Democratic challenger Lindsey Simmons, although Democrats have carried Boone County in recent elections.

Boone County, along with the rest of the state of Missouri, is represented in the U.S. Senate by Josh Hawley (R-Columbia) and Roy Blunt (R-Strafford). However, their Democratic opponents carried Boone County in each of their respective most recent elections.

Blunt was elected to a second term in 2016 over then-Missouri Secretary of State Jason Kander.

Political culture
At the presidential level, Boone County has been one of the most consistently Democratic counties in Missouri. George W. Bush was the last Republican presidential nominee to carry Boone County in 2004 with a plurality of the vote, no Republican has won a majority in the county in a presidential election since Ronald Reagan in 1984.

Missouri presidential preference primaries

2020
The 2020 presidential primaries for both the Democratic and Republican parties were held in Missouri on March 10. On the Democratic side, former Vice President Joe Biden (D-Delaware) both won statewide by a wide margin and carried a majority in Boone County. Biden went on to defeat President Donald Trump in the general election.

Incumbent President Donald Trump (R-Florida) faced a primary challenge from former Massachusetts Governor Bill Weld, but won both Boone County and statewide by overwhelming margins.

2016
The 2016 presidential primaries for both the Republican and Democratic parties were held in Missouri on March 15. Businessman Donald Trump (R-New York) narrowly won the state overall, but Senator Ted Cruz (R-Texas) carried a plurality of the vote in Boone County. Trump went on to win the nomination and the presidency.

On the Democratic side, former Secretary of State Hillary Clinton (D-New York) narrowly won statewide, but Senator Bernie Sanders (I-Vermont) won Boone County by a wide margin.

2012
The 2012 Missouri Republican Presidential Primary's results were nonbinding on the state's national convention delegates. Voters in Boone County supported former U.S. Senator Rick Santorum (R-Pennsylvania), who finished first in the state at large, but eventually lost the nomination to former Governor Mitt Romney (R-Massachusetts). Delegates to the congressional district and state conventions were chosen at a county caucus, which selected a delegation favoring Congressman Ron Paul (R-Texas). Incumbent President Barack Obama easily won the Missouri Democratic Primary and renomination. He defeated Romney in the general election.

2008
In 2008, the Missouri Republican Presidential Primary was closely contested, with Senator John McCain (R-Arizona) prevailing and eventually winning the nomination. Former Governor Mitt Romney (R-Massachusetts) won a plurality in Boone County.

Then-Senator Barack Obama (D-Illinois) received more votes than any candidate from either party in Boone County during the 2008 presidential primary. Despite initial reports that Hillary Clinton (D-New York), also a senator at the time, had won Missouri, Obama narrowly defeated her statewide and later became that year's Democratic nominee, going on to win the presidency.

Communities

Cities

Ashland
Centralia
Columbia (county seat)
Hallsville
Rocheport
Sturgeon

Villages

Harrisburg
Hartsburg
Huntsdale
McBaine
Pierpont

Unincorporated communities

 Bourbon
 Browns
 Claysville
 Deer Park
 Easley
 Englewood
 Ginlet
 Harg
 Hinton
 Oldham
 Midway
 Prathersville
 Providence
 Riggs
 Rucker
 Shaw
 Two Mile Prairie
 Wilton
 Woodlandville

Townships
Township boundaries have changed over time.  See links at end of article for maps of Boone County showing boundaries of different dates.  As a rule, older townships were split, with newer townships created from their subdivisions.  This is significant for historical and genealogical research.  Note that maps show changes in township boundaries between 1898 and 1930 were minimal.

 Bourbon
 Cedar
 Centralia
 Columbia
 Katy
 Missouri
 Perche
 Rock Bridge
 Rocky Fork
 Three Creeks

Public safety
 
The Boone County Sheriff has jurisdiction over the whole county. The Boone County Fire Protection District provides fire protection and emergency medical services for a large portion of Boone County, Missouri. The BCFPD is the largest volunteer fire department and third largest fire service organization in the state, protecting  of residential, commercial, industrial and agricultural property and over 50,000 people. The Boone County Fire District maintains 15 fire stations, a training center, and a headquarters facility.

History
Prior to 1964, there was no organized fire protection in Boone County. This changed after an elderly handicapped woman died in a house fire just west of the city limits of Columbia. A small group of CB radio enthusiasts, known as the Central Missouri Radio Squad, banded together to develop a fire protection system for Boone County.

USAR Task Force

Boone County Fire is the sponsoring agency of Urban Search and Rescue Missouri Task Force 1 (MO-TF1) which is one of the 28 FEMA Urban Search and Rescue Task Forces across the United States. The team is made up of 210 members that are qualified in various aspects of urban search and rescue.

Notable people

James William Abert – soldier and explorer
David W. Alexander, 19th century Los Angeles, California politician and sheriff
Thomas M. Allen – clergyman
Benjamin Anderson – economist
Gary Anderson – football player
Simon Barrett – filmmaker
Rob Benedict – actor
Duane Benton – judge
Rebecca Blank – educator; acting U.S. Secretary of Commerce (2011-2011; 2012–2013)
Philemon Bliss – U.S. Representative from Ohio (1855–1859), 1st Chief Justice of the Supreme Court of Dakota Territory, and Associate Justice of Missouri Supreme Court (1868–1872)
John William Boone – musician
Stratton D. Brooks – college president
Fleda Brown – poet
Jessica Capshaw – actress
Russ Carnahan – U.S. Representative from Missouri (2005–2013)
Albert Bishop Chance, inventor of the earth anchor, mayor of Centralia, and founder of the A.B. Chance Company
J'den Cox – wrestler, Olympic medalist
Kevin Croom – UFC Mixed Martial Artist
Jack D. Crouch – hotelier
Derek "Deke" Dickerson – musician
Carl Edwards – retired NASCAR driver
Jane Froman – singer; actress
Nicole Galloway – Missouri State Auditor (2015–present), Democratic nominee for Governor of Missouri (2020)
Chuck Graham – politician
Ken Griffin – organist
Eugene Jerome Hainer – U.S. Representative from Nebraska (1893–1897)
William Least Heat-Moon – writer
Martin Heinrich – U.S. Senator from New Mexico (2013–present), U.S. Representative from New Mexico (2009–2013)
Peter Hessler – journalist
Darwin Hindman – mayor of Columbia (1995–2010)
Brett James – singer
William Jewell – educator, second mayor of Columbia
Leon W. Johnson – Air Force General
Tyler Johnson – baseball pitcher
Daniel Webster Jones – Mormon pioneer
John Carleton Jones – president of the University of Missouri
Lloyd E. Jones – United States Army major general
Kraig Kann – golf commentator
Henry Kirklin, horticulturalist, first black instructor at the University of Missouri
E. Stanley Kroenke – sports mogul
Sergei Kopeikin – astrophysicist
Ken Lay – chief executive, Enron
Grace Lee – radio and television personality
Guy Sumner Lowman, Jr. – linguist
Jeff Maggert – professional golfer
William Rainey Marshall – 5th Governor of Minnesota (1866–1870)
William L. Nelson – U.S. Representative from Missouri (1861–1865)
John Neihardt – poet
Don Nardo – author
Korla Pandit – musician
Carlos Pena Jr. – singer
Michael Porter Jr. – basketball player for Denver Nuggets
William Rainey Marshall – Minnesota Governor 
James S. Rollins – 19th-century politician
Jesse M. Roper – 19th-century naval officer
Charles Griffith Ross – press secretary for U.S. President Harry S. Truman
Felix Sabates – philanthropist
Max Schwabe – U.S. Representative from Missouri (1943–1949)
Jon Scott – television journalist
John F. Shafroth – U.S. Senator from Colorado (1913–1919), Governor of Colorado (1909–1913), U.S. Representative from Colorado (1895–1904)
Clay Shirky – writer
Apollo M. O. Smith – aviation executive
William Smith – actor
William J. Stone – U.S. Senator from Missouri (1903–1918), Governor of Missouri (1893–1897), U.S. Representative from Missouri (1885–1891)
Blake Tekotte – baseball player
Malcolm Thomas – professional basketball player
Nischelle Turner – television personality
Zbylut Twardowski – nephrologist
Charlie Van Dyke – radio personality
Andrew VanWyngarden – musician
James "Bud" Walton – co-founder, Wal-Mart
Sam Walton – co-founder, Wal-Mart
Edwin Moss Watson – editor; publisher
Norbert Wiener – mathematician
Lisa Wilcox – actress
Roger B. Wilson – 52nd Governor of Missouri (2000–2001)

See also
The Big Tree, landmark and national champion Bur Oak
List of cemeteries in Boone County, Missouri
National Register of Historic Places listings in Boone County, Missouri
Boone County Historical Society

References

Further reading
 History of Boone County, Missouri: Written and comp. from the most authentic official and private sources; including a history of its townships, towns, and villages. Together with ... biographical sketches and portraits of prominent citizens (1882) online

External links
 Digitized 1930 Plat Book of Boone County  from University of Missouri Division of Special Collections, Archives, and Rare Books
Map of Boone County in 1898, showing township boundaries of that date: 
Map of Boone County in 1917, showing township boundaries of that date: 
Map of Boone County in 1930, showing township boundaries of that date: 
Map Boone County today, showing current township boundaries: 

 
Little Dixie (Missouri)
Columbia metropolitan area (Missouri)
1820 establishments in Missouri Territory
Populated places established in 1820
Missouri counties on the Missouri River